Trochalopteron is a genus of passerine birds in the laughingthrush family Leiothrichidae.

Taxonomy
The genus Trochalopteron was introduced in 1843 by the English zoologist Edward Blyth. The name combines the Ancient Greek trokhalos meaning "round" or "bowed" with pteron meaning "wing". The type species was designated in 1930 by E. C. Stuart Baker as the scaly laughingthrush.

Species
The genus contains the following 19 species:

Former species
Two species that were formerly included in this genus have been moved to Montecincla based on phylogenetic studies that showed them to be more distantly related to the Trochalopteron clade than to a clade formed by species in the genera Leiothrix, Actinodura, Minla, Crocias and Heterophasia.

 Black-chinned laughingthrush, Montecincla cachinnans (with jerdoni separated as a full species)
 Kerala laughingthrush, Montecincla fairbanki

References

 
Bird genera
Leiothrichidae
Taxa named by Edward Blyth